1167 Dubiago, provisional designation , is a dark asteroid from the outer region of the asteroid belt, approximately 63 kilometers in diameter. It was discovered on 3 August 1930, by Soviet astronomer Evgenii Skvortsov at Simeiz Observatory on the Crimean peninsula, and named after astronomer Alexander Dubyago.

Classification and orbit 

Dubiago orbits the Sun in the outer main-belt at a distance of 3.2–3.7 AU once every 6 years and 4 months (2,305 days). Its orbit has an eccentricity of 0.07 and an inclination of 6° with respect to the ecliptic. The body's observation arc begins at Yerkes Observatory about two months after its official discovery at Simeiz.

Physical characteristics 

In the Tholen classification, Dubiago is a D-type asteroid, a group of 46 known bodies, mostly being Jupiter trojans and centaurs such as 10199 Chariklo and 624 Hektor. It is thought that the Martian moon Phobos has a similar composition, and that the Tagish Lake meteorite origins from a D-type asteroid.

Lightcurves 

In March 1990, a rotational lightcurve of Dubiago was obtained using the Nordic Optical Telescope at the La Palma site on the Canary Islands. Lightcurve analysis gave a rotation period of 14.3 hours with a brightness variation of 0.23 magnitude. A second lightcurve was obtained in the R-band at the Palomar Transient Factory in October 2013, giving an alternative period solution of 34.8374 hours with an amplitude of 0.21 magnitude.

Diameter and albedo 

According to the surveys carried out by the Infrared Astronomical Satellite IRAS and the Japanese Akari satellite, Dubiago measures 63.12 and 75.79 kilometers in diameter, and its surface has an albedo of 0.051 and 0.036, respectively. The Collaborative Asteroid Lightcurve Link adopts the results obtained by IRAS with an absolute magnitude of 9.85.

Naming 

This minor planet was named in honor of Alexander Dubyago (1903–1959), a renowned astronomer of the Soviet Union. The lunar crater Dubyago is also named in his and his father's honour. The approved naming was suggested by the Russian Institute of Theoretical Astronomy (ITA) and the official  was published by the Minor Planet Center on 1 June 1967.

References

External links 
 Asteroid Lightcurve Database (LCDB), query form (info )
 Dictionary of Minor Planet Names, Google books
 Asteroids and comets rotation curves, CdR – Observatoire de Genève, Raoul Behrend
 Discovery Circumstances: Numbered Minor Planets (1)-(5000) – Minor Planet Center
 
 

 

001167
Discoveries by Evgenii Skvortsov
Named minor planets
001167
19300803